Alibeyli, Mersin may refer to two villages in Mersin Province, Turkey:

 Alibeyli, Erdemli
 Alibeyli, Tarsus

See also
 Alibeyli, for other places with the same name